Rosemary Ann Sexton (born 16 July 1977) is a British athlete, sports therapist, osteopath, and politician. She had a career in mixed martial arts (MMA), from which she retired in 2014. In 2020, Sexton ran in the Green Party leadership election and came second.

Education and early life
Sexton was born in Versailles, France but moved to Britain at a young age, and grew up and received her education in the United Kingdom. She attended Kendrick School, Reading.  Her father commented "what consistently runs through Rosi’s life is winning: she has a need to win. Her physics teacher said ‘Rosi has a meticulous approach to her studies and nothing short of perfection satisfies her' ".

Music
Sexton was a musician and played with the Reading Youth Orchestra while at school (from 1991 to 1995). She reached grade 7 in cello and grade 8 in piano, then became an Associate of the London College of Music Examinations (piano). In November 1994, aged 17, she played in the Royal Albert Hall, with the Reading Youth Orchestra. She also played the organ ("though I never got very good").

Mathematics
In 1995, Sexton was admitted to Trinity College, Cambridge, where she took a first class degree in mathematics (1998). Her tutor in mathematics was Tim Gowers. She preferred pure maths: her particular interests were logic, combinatorics and number theory.
She then moved to the University of Manchester, where she achieved a Master of Science (MSc) degree in mathematical logic in 2000.  She went on to complete a PhD in theoretical computer science. Her supervisor was Harold Simmons who held a joint position in the School of Mathematics and the Department of Computer Science, with whom she wrote two papers Point-sensitive and point-free patch constructions. and An ordinal indexed hierarchy of separation properties. The first of these papers has eight citations. Sexton's academic interests have been discussed in an interview by David Colquhoun.

Political activity
In May 2019, Sexton was elected as a Green Party councillor in the Shirley West ward of the Solihull Metropolitan Borough Council. In the same election, her partner Stephen Caudwell was elected as Green Party councillor for the Castle Bromwich ward. She ran in Solihull as a parliamentary candidate in the 2019 general election, losing to Julian Knight and coming in fourth with 3.7% of the vote.

On 28 June 2020, it was announced that Sexton would stand as a candidate in the Green Party of England and Wales leadership election. A website was created for her campaign. The results were announced on 9 September 2020: Sexton came second, beaten by incumbent leaders Jonathan Bartley and Siân Berry.

Mixed martial arts career
Sexton had been involved in martial arts since she was at school. She already held dan grades in jujutsu and Taekwondo.  In 2000, after 10 years' experience in martial arts, she decided to train in Mixed Martial Arts and Brazilian Jiu-Jitsu, as a way of proving to herself that what she had learned was applicable to real life. A clue to the reason for this career change may be found in her comment  "The other things I did, the music, the maths, just weren't quite hard enough"

At the same time, she trained in osteopathy, receiving a degree in that subject from Oxford Brookes University in 2010. She currently practices as an Osteopath in the Birmingham (Solihull) area, with a particular interest in sports injuries and evidence-based practice. 
She has written about the problem of performance-enhancing drugs (doping) in combat sports, and is a supporter of the Voluntary Anti-Doping Association, VADA. She is a spokesperson for SafeMMA, an organisation dedicated to ensuring safety of competitors, and she runs a combat sports injury clinic. In 2018, aged 41, she was promoted to black belt in BJJ by Paul Rimmer.

Early MMA career
Sexton made her mixed martial arts debut on 11 May 2002. She won her first five fights before moving up in weight to face Gina Carano on 15 September 2006. Sexton was defeated by knockout late in the second round.

BodogFight
Sexton debuted for BodogFight on 16 December 2006 and upset Brazilian submission specialist Carina Damm with an armbar late in the first round.

On 17 February 2007, Sexton faced Japanese striker "Windy" Tomomi Sunaba at a BodogFight event in Costa Rica. Sexton won the fight by Technical Decision in the second round after Sunaba suffered a serious ankle injury.

Sexton fought once more for BodogFight and submitted Julia Berezikova on 24 August 2007.

EliteXC
Sexton signed an exclusive three-fight contract with Elite XC in June 2008. She faced Debi Purcell at the 15 August 2008 ShoXC event in Friant, California and defeated Purcell by split decision.

Bellator Fighting Championships
Following the demise of Elite XC, Sexton debuted for Bellator Fighting Championships at Bellator 12 on 19 June 2009. She submitted Valerie Coolbaugh with an armbar in the first round.

Sexton was scheduled to face Angela Magaña at CWFC 37: Right To Fight on 22 May 2010, but Magana suffered an injury and Sexton was matched against Emi Fujino. However, due to Sexton's re-signing with Bellator, her CWFC fight was cancelled.

Sexton faced Zoila Gurgel at Bellator 23 on 24 June. She was defeated by knockout exactly two minutes into the first round.

As a result of the knockout loss, Sexton was given a 60-day medical suspension and did not compete in the Bellator women's 115-pound tournament.

Cage Warriors Fighting Championship
Sexton returned to face Sally Krumdiack at Cage Warriors Fighting Championship 39 on 27 November 2010 in Cork, Ireland. She won via TKO in the second round.

Sexton faced Roxanne Modafferi at Cage Warriors Fighting Championship 40 on 26 February 2011. She defeated Modafferi by unanimous decision.

Sexton was scheduled to face Sheila Gaff at Cage Warriors Fighting Championship 43 on 9 July 2011 for the Cage Warriors Women's Super Flyweight Championship at 125 pounds. However, she suffered a concussion during training and was forced to withdraw from the fight.

On 2 June 2012, Sexton faced Aisling Daly at Cage Warriors Fighting Championship 47. The bout was part of a tournament to crown a Cage Warriors 125-pound women's champion. Sexton defeated Daly by unanimous decision to advance to the tournament final.

Sexton was scheduled to face Sheila Gaff in the finals at Cage Warriors Fighting Championship 49 on 27 October 2012 in Cardiff, Wales. Voluntary Anti-Doping Association (VADA) drug testing was used in the weeks prior to the planned fight. However, the bout was cancelled on 19 October when Gaff withdrew due to illness.

Ultimate Fighting Championship
Sexton moved up in weight to make her UFC debut in Winnipeg, Manitoba, Canada on the UFC 161 card against Alexis Davis on 15 June 2013. Sexton lost the fight by unanimous decision (29–28, 29–27, and 29–28).

On 26 October 2013, Sexton returned to the Octagon and faced Jéssica Andrade at UFC Fight Night 30. She lost the fight via unanimous decision (30–26, 30–27, and 30–26). Sexton was released from the promotion shortly after the fight.

On 21 June 2014, Sexton announced her retirement from MMA competition.

Mixed martial arts record

|-
| Loss
| align=center| 13–5
| Joanna Jędrzejczyk
| KO (punch)
| Cage Warriors Fighting Championship 69
| 
| align=center| 2
| align=center| 2:36
| London, England
| 
|-
| Loss
| align=center| 13–4
| Jéssica Andrade
| Decision (unanimous)
| UFC Fight Night: Machida vs. Munoz
| 
| align=center| 3
| align=center| 5:00
| Manchester, England
| 
|-
| Loss
| align=center| 13–3
| Alexis Davis
| Decision (unanimous)
| UFC 161
| 
| align=center| 3
| align=center| 5:00
| Winnipeg, Manitoba, Canada
| 
|-
| Win
| align=center| 13–2
| Aisling Daly
| Decision (unanimous)
| Cage Warriors: 47
| 
| align=center| 3
| align=center| 5:00
| Dublin, Ireland
| 
|-
| Win
| align=center| 12–2
| Roxanne Modafferi
| Decision (unanimous)
| Cage Warriors: 40
| 
| align=center| 3
| align=center| 5:00
| North London, England
| 
|-
| Win
| align=center| 11–2
| Sally Krumdiack
| TKO (punches)
| Cage Warriors 39: The Uprising
| 
| align=center| 2
| align=center| 4:07
| Cork, Ireland
| 
|-
| Loss
| align=center| 10–2
| Zoila Frausto Gurgel
| KO (knee and punches)
| Bellator 23
| 
| align=center| 1
| align=center| 2:00
| Louisville, Kentucky, United States
| 
|-
| Win
| align=center| 10–1
| Valerie Coolbaugh
| Submission (armbar)
| Bellator 12
| 
| align=center| 1
| align=center| 3:40
| Hollywood, Florida, United States
| 
|-
| Win
| align=center| 9–1
| Debi Purcell
| Decision (split)
| ShoXC: Hamman vs. Suganuma 2
| 
| align=center| 3
| align=center| 3:00
| Friant, California, United States
| 
|-
| Win
| align=center| 8–1
| Julia Berezikova
| Submission (armbar)
| BodogFight: Vancouver
| 
| align=center| 2
| align=center| 1:49
| Vancouver, British Columbia, Canada
| 
|-
| Win
| align=center| 7–1
| Tomomi Sunaba
| Technical Decision (unanimous)
| BodogFight: Costa Rica
| 
| align=center| 2
| align=center| 1:05
| San José, Costa Rica
| 
|-
| Win
| align=center| 6–1
| Carina Damm
| Submission (armbar)
| BodogFight: St. Petersburg
| 
| align=center| 1
| align=center| 4:15
| Saint Petersburg, Russia
| 
|-
| Loss
| align=center| 5–1
| Gina Carano
| KO (punch)
| World Pro Fighting Championships
| 
| align=center| 2
| align=center| 4:55
| Las Vegas, Nevada, United States
| 
|-
| Win
| align=center| 5–0
| Dina Van den Hooven
| TKO (corner stoppage)
| CWFC: Strike Force 4
| 
| align=center| 3
| align=center| 5:00
| English Midlands, England
| 
|-
| Win
| align=center| 4–0
| Kelli Salone
| Submission (armbar)
| P & G 1: Pride and Glory 1
| 
| align=center| 1
| align=center| 3:45
| Cardiff, Wales
| 
|-
| Win
| align=center| 3–0
| Carla O'Sullivan
| Submission (rear-naked choke)
| CWFC 3: Cage Warriors 3
| 
| align=center| 1
| align=center| N/A
| Hampshire, England
| 
|-
| Win
| align=center| 2–0
| Serena Saunders
| Submission (armbar)
| CWFC 1: Armageddon
| 
| align=center| 1
| align=center| 0:40
| London, England
| 
|-
| Win
| align=center| 1–0
| Angela Boyce
| Submission (armbar)
| G & S 5: Grapple & Strike 5
| 
| align=center| 3
| align=center| N/A
| Worcester, England
|

Mixed martial arts achievements
 Cage Warriors Women's 132 lbs Champion (2005)
 BodogFight Women's 125 lbs Champion
 First British woman to fight in the UFC

Personal life
Sexton has one son. In 2010, she qualified as an osteopath after completing her BSc Osteopathy degree at Oxford Brookes University. She has a passion for climbing and in 2017 climbed the highest artificial climbing wall in the world, Luzzone Dam, in Switzerland. The climb was sponsored for the benefit of the Mind charity.

References

1977 births
British sportsperson-politicians
English female mixed martial artists
Female Brazilian jiu-jitsu practitioners
English female taekwondo practitioners
English jujutsuka
Mixed martial artists utilizing jujutsu
Mixed martial artists utilizing taekwondo
Mixed martial artists utilizing Brazilian jiu-jitsu
English practitioners of Brazilian jiu-jitsu
Living people
Flyweight mixed martial artists
People educated at Kendrick School
People associated with the Department of Computer Science, University of Manchester
Alumni of the University of Manchester
Osteopaths
Alumni of Trinity College, Cambridge
Bantamweight mixed martial artists
British sports physicians
Councillors in the West Midlands (county)
Green Party of England and Wales parliamentary candidates
Green Party of England and Wales councillors
British politicians of Chinese descent
English people of Chinese descent
Women councillors in England
Ultimate Fighting Championship female fighters